The Agartala Combined Cycle Power Plant 135 MW (4 x 21 MW + 2 x 25.5 MW) is a joint venture between the NTPC and NEEPCO which was completed in 1997–98. It is located in the West Tripura District of the state of Tripura near the capital town of Agartala, India.

References

Power stations in Tripura
1997 establishments in Tripura
Energy infrastructure completed in 1997
20th-century architecture in India